Ted Hewitt is an American country music producer, songwriter, singer, and musician who has written and performed songs for numerous acts including Rodney Atkins, Tracy Byrd, Glen Campbell, Reba McEntire, and others. He co-produced Atkins' 2006 album, If You're Going Through Hell, which was certified platinum by the RIAA. Other popular tracks written or produced by Hewitt include "Love Lessons" by Tracy Byrd (#9 on Billboard's Hot Country Songs) and "Wine into Water" by T. Graham Brown (#44).

Early life and education
Hewitt grew up in Baltimore, Maryland and was the child of two professional musicians. His father was an opera singer and actor who appeared alongside Andy Griffith in the Broadway production of No Time for Sergeants. Hewitt learned how to play the guitar at the age of 15. His father died early in his life. Hewitt graduated from Emory College in Atlanta, Georgia before moving to Nashville, Tennessee in 1984. It was there that he began his career in country music.

Career
Upon arriving in Nashville, Hewitt worked closely with producers like Buddy Cannon and Country legend Mel Tillis. Tillis signed Hewitt to a publishing contract in 1985. His first cut was called "Leavin' Eyes" which he wrote for Glen Campbell. Hewitt also sang on the recording of the song. After his publishing contract with Tillis ended, Hewitt toured with a range of artists including Vern Gosdin, Suzy Bogguss, and Lee Greenwood.

Hewitt went back to writing and composing in 1992 when he signed a publishing contract with Lee Greenwood. In 1995, he wrote Tracy Byrd's "Love Lessons" which peaked at #9 on Billboard's list of Hot Country Songs. While working for Greenwood, Hewitt also met Rodney Atkins and formed a songwriting partnership that continues to the present day. Hewitt helped Atkins earn a record contract at Curb Records in 1997. The following year, he wrote T. Graham Brown's "Wine into Water" which peaked at #44 on the Hot Country Songs list.

Hewitt produced Rodney Atkins' 2003 album Honesty which peaked at #50 on the Billboard list of Top Country Albums. This ultimately led to Hewitt producing Atkins' 2006 platinum-selling album, If You're Going Through Hell. The album peaked at #1 on the Top Country Albums list and at #3 on the Billboard 200 list and contained four #1 singles. In recognition of the album, Atkins was awarded the Academy of Country Music Award for Top New Male Vocalist in 2006. The album was also nominated for Album of the Year, the title track was nominated for Song of the Year, and Hewitt himself was nominated for Producer of the Year.

Hewitt has also produced other albums and tracks for Rodney Atkins including the albums It's America (2009) and Take a Back Road (2011). Most recently, Hewitt produced a 2014 single for Atkins called "Eat Sleep Love You Repeat." In 2014, Hewitt was nominated by the Canadian Country Music Association (CCMA) for the Best Record Producer award for his work on Brett Kissel's album, Started with a Song. He was again nominated for a CCMA Award in 2017 for Songwriter of the Year for co-writing Brett Kissel's song, "Cool with That." Over the course of his career, Hewitt has also produced and performed on albums for artists like Waylon Jennings, Reba McEntire, Wynonna Judd, Les Taylor, Alabama, and numerous others.

Selected discography

Studio albums

As producer

As vocalist

Singles

As songwriter/producer

References

External links
Ted Hewitt on AllMusic
Ted Hewitt on Discogs

People from Baltimore
Living people
Year of birth missing (living people)
American singer-songwriters
American male singer-songwriters